Kurt Dornis (born 7 October 1930) is a German painter, graphic artist and draughtsman associated with the Leipzig School. His family fled to Leipzig in 1944 and he became a professional painter in 1952. His paintings often depict life in Leipzig and the cityscape itself from unusual perspectives. His style has been called "neoverist".

References

External links
 Official website 

1930 births
20th-century German painters
20th-century German male artists
21st-century German painters
21st-century German male artists
German contemporary artists
German draughtsmen
German graphic designers
German male painters
Living people
People from Głogów